Rishika Singh (born Rohini Singh) is an Indian actor who appears in Kannada-language films. She is the daughter of film director Rajendra Singh Babu and granddaughter of Mysore-based film producer Shankar Singh and former Kannada actress Pratima Devi. Her brother Aditya also appears in Kannada films.

Early life 
Rishika Singh was born as Rohini Singh to film director Rajendra Singh Babu in Bengaluru. She was born to a family of film personalities with her grandfather Shankar Singh being a film producer and grandmother Pratima Devi, a Kannada film actress. She is the niece of Sangram Singh and actors Vijayalakshmi Singh and Jai Jagadish.

She completed her graduation from Mount Carmel College, Bangalore, in the year 2008.

Career 
Rishika Singh made her debut in films in the 2011 Kannada-language film Kanteerava. She then appeared in the multi-starrer comedy film Kalla Malla Sulla in the same year. In 2012, Singh hosted a talk show titled Ragale with Rishika that aired on Zee Kannada. In 2013, she got into a controversy after her morphed obscene video clip was uploaded on a social website by the actor-director S. K. Basheed of her film Benki Birugali, against whom she filed a case. She was one of the contestants in the reality TV show Bigg Boss in its first season. She appeared in an item song for Maanikya (2014).

Personal life
Rishika Singh was engaged to Sandeep, a businessman from Bangalore in December 2012. However, the wedding was called off, following which Singh was hospitalized due to a nervous breakdown.

Filmography

Television

References

External links
 

21st-century Indian actresses
Actresses in Kannada cinema
Indian film actresses
Living people
Actresses from Bangalore
Year of birth missing (living people)
Bigg Boss Kannada contestants
Mount Carmel College, Bangalore alumni